Engine House No. 6 may refer to:

 Engine House No. 6 (Columbus, Ohio), listed on the NRHP in Columbus, Ohio
 Engine House No. 6 (Wichita, Kansas)
 Engine House No. 6 (Baltimore, Maryland)
 Engine House No. 6 (Lawrence, Massachusetts)

See also
Engine House (disambiguation)